The year 1460 AD in science and technology included many events, some of which are listed here.

Exploration
 The Cape Verde Island of Sal is discovered, originally named "Llana" (meaning "flat").

Technology
 The Catholicon is printed in Germany.

Births

Deaths

References

 
15th century in science